Yared Zinabu (born 22 June 1989) is an Ethiopian footballer. He currently plays for Saint-George SA and is a member of the Ethiopian national football team.

Career

Yared is left wing or central midfielder, however, he can play left back position, too. He currently plays for Saint-George SA.

International career

Yared debuted for Ethiopia in 2007. He is on the final list of players called for 2013 African Nations Cup.

References

External links
 

1989 births
Living people
Ethiopian footballers
Ethiopia international footballers
2013 Africa Cup of Nations players
Saint George S.C. players
Sportspeople from Addis Ababa
Association football midfielders